Pasupuleti (Telugu: పసుపులేటి) is an Indian surname. It is a popular and dominant surname in the Telugu Kapu Naidu community.

 Pasupuleti Kannamba, Indian actress and playback singer of Telugu cinema
 Pasupuleti Krishna Vamsi is an Indian film director
 Pasupuleti Ramesh Naidu was an Indian music director
 Pasupuleti Madhavi Latha is an Indian actress in Telugu cinema 
 Reshma Pasupuleti is an Indian actress in Tamil cinema. 

Indian surnames